Dj Rimo Jackson also known as Dj Rimo is Zimbabwean club mix, tour disc jockey and artist based in Zimbabwe
.

Born Tinotenda Takunda Marimo, Dj Rimo was born in Harare, Zimbabwe where he grew up. He attended his primary education at Alex Park primary school then proceeded to St George’s College and later Prince Edward high school for his high school education. Dj Rimo began his career in 2009 and he rose to prominence in 2010 when he became tour dj for Akon and Sean Paul in Zimbabwe and Beenie Man later on the same year and since 2010 he has been touring with several international artist who visit Zimbabwe including Lil Kim, Fat Joe and South African popular dj duo Major League Djz. In 2021, DJ Rimo was listed among African Djs to look out for in 2022 by Pulse Magazine Ghana then in 2022 he recognized as the “Best Male DJ” of the year at the African Social Entertainment Awards which were held in South Africa in December 2022.

In 2023, Dj Rimo released his first single track called Vele Malume.

References

Living people
South African DJs
Year of birth missing (living people)